The 171st Pennsylvania House of Representatives District is located in Centre County and Mifflin County and includes the following areas:

 Centre County
 Bellefonte
 Centre Hall
 College Township
 Ferguson Township (PART)
 District East
 District North [PART, Divisions 01 and 03]
 District West Central
 Gregg Township
 Harris Township
 Millheim 
 Centre County (continued)
 Penn Township
 Potter Township
 Spring Township
 Walker Township
 Mifflin County
 Armagh Township 
 Brown Township
 Decatur Township
 Union Township

Representatives

References

Government of Centre County, Pennsylvania
Government of Mifflin County, Pennsylvania
171